Claude Nicolet (15 September 1930 – 24 December 2010) was a 20th-21st century French historian, a specialist of the institutions and political ideas of ancient Rome.

Biography

Career 
A former student of the École normale supérieure, agrégé d'histoire and a member of the École française de Rome from 1957 to 1959, he was a professor of ancient history at the University of Tunis, Caen University then de Paris-I Panthéon-Sorbonne, and emeritus director of studies from 1997 at the École pratique des hautes études. Elected a member of the Académie des inscriptions et belles-lettres in 1986, he was director of the École française de Rome from 1992 to 1995.

Ministerial advisor 
He made a short political career as a member of Pierre Mendès France's cabinet in 1956. He was secretary, then editor-in- chief of the Cahiers de la République, and assigned to the office of Jean-Pierre Chevènement, between 1984 and 2002, on civic education.

He showed anxiety throughout his life to articulate his republican commitment and his career as a historian. This contributed to the originality of his work, straddling between ancient Rome and contemporary times, especially around the functioning of society and political institutions. As Catherine Virlouvet pointed out, "it is the same questioning that unites Le métier de citoyen dans la Rome antique (1976) and L'idée républicaine en France.

The republican idea in France 
According to Céline Spector, Nicolet's work L'idée républicaine en France (1982) contributed to the return of the Republican idea in the 1980s. According to him, it was Rousseau who provided the theoretical basis for the notion of a republic as it is understood in France. In particular, it resumed its concept of sovereignty and its theory of law to the citizen of Geneva. Nicolet writes:

Main works 
1957: Le radicalisme, Paris, Presses universitaires de France, 5th edition 1983, coll. "Que sais-je?", n° 761
1959: Pierre Mendès France ou Le métier de Cassandre, Paris, Éditions Julliard
1966: L'ordre équestre à l'époque républicaine, 312-43 av JC, thèse d'État (2 vol.), Paris, coll. BEFAR
1967: Les Gracques : crise agraire et révolution à Rome, Paris, Éditions Gallimard
1976: Le métier de citoyen dans la Rome républicaine, Paris, Gallimard
1976: Tributum, Bonn, Habelt
1978: Rome et la conquête du monde méditerranéen 264–27 av JC (2 vol.), Presses universitaires de France, series "Nouvelle Clio", .
1980: Insula sacra : la loi Gabinia-Calpurnia de Délos (58 av JC), École française de Rome 
1982: L'idée républicaine en France : essai d'histoire critique (1789-1924), Gallimard, series "Bibliothèque des histoires"; reprint Gallimard, 1994, series "Tel".
1988: L'inventaire du monde : géographie et politique aux origines de l'Empire romain, Fayard, 
1992 : La République en France. État des lieux, Paris, Le Seuil
1998: Rendre à César : économie et société dans la Rome antique, Gallimard, series "Bibliothèque des histoires".
1999: Mégapoles méditerranéennes : géographie urbaine rétrospective, actes du colloque de Rome (May 1996), Rome, École française de Rome
2000: Histoire, Nation, République, Paris, 
2000: Censeurs et publicains : économie et fiscalité dans la Rome antique, Fayard, .
2003: La fabrique d'une nation : la France entre Rome et les Germains, Paris, 
2003: (with Anne-Cécile Robert and ) Le peuple inattendu, Paris, Syllepse

Bibliography

References 

Writers from Marseille
1930 births
2010 deaths
20th-century French historians
21st-century French historians
French scholars of Roman history
École Normale Supérieure alumni
Academic staff of the University of Caen Normandy
Academic staff of the École pratique des hautes études
Members of the Académie des Inscriptions et Belles-Lettres
Commandeurs of the Ordre des Palmes Académiques
Corresponding Fellows of the British Academy